In Norse mythology, Glær or Glenr is a horse listed in both Grímnismál and Gylfaginning among the steeds ridden by the gods each day when they go to make judgements at Yggdrasil. However, in both poems Glær is not assigned to any specific deity.

See also
 List of fictional horses

References

Horses in Norse mythology